Do Ya may refer to:

 Do Ya (album), a 2008 album by The Screaming Jets
 "Do Ya" (Jump5 song)
 "Do Ya" (K. T. Oslin song)
 "Do Ya" (The Move song), also covered by the Electric Light Orchestra both live and on their album A New World Record
 "Do Ya"/"Stay with Me", a single by McFly
 "Do Ya", a song by Barney Bentall and the Legendary Hearts: Barney Bentall and the Legendary Hearts#Singles
 Do Ya (Anthony Jasmin song)
 "Do Ya?", a song by Nick Mason from Nick Mason's Fictitious Sports
 "Do Ya", a song by Peaches from Impeach My Bush

See also 
 Do You (disambiguation)